Our Lady of the Valley is a large Catholic church and school located in the Canoga Park section of Los Angeles, California. It is the oldest parish in the western San Fernando Valley, having been established in 1921. When the parish was established, the western Valley was sparsely populated, and most of the 620 parishioners were involved in agriculture with livestock or walnut and orange groves. At the time of its formation, the parish's boundaries covered  from the Pacific Ocean to the south, the Ventura County line to the west, White Oak Avenue to the east, and the Santa Susana Mountains to the north. In the years after World War II, the San Fernando Valley shifted from agriculture to residential communities, and the Catholic population also swelled. The  served by Our Lady of the Valley were carved up among nine sister parishes. Though its territory has been reduced to four square miles, the parish has grown from 620 parishioners to over 4100 families.

Msgr. John J. Hurley was pastor at Our Lady of the Valley from 1943 until 1975.

The church sustained $800,000 in damage in the 1994 Northridge earthquake. It was renovated and reopened in November 1995.

See also
 San Fernando Pastoral Region

References

External links
Our Lady of the Valley History
Our Lady of the Valley School

Roman Catholic churches in California
Education in Los Angeles
Elementary schools in California
Catholic elementary schools in California
Roman Catholic churches in Los Angeles
Christian organizations established in 1921
1921 establishments in California